Cedar Key School is a public K-12 school located in Cedar Key, Florida, U.S.. It was founded as a private school in the 19th century and is the smallest public high school in the state of Florida.

Notable alumni
 W. Randolph Hodges - former President of the Florida Senate
 Gene Hodges - former member of the Florida House of Representatives

References

External links

School profile

High schools in Levy County, Florida
Public high schools in Florida
Public middle schools in Florida
Public elementary schools in Florida
Cedar Key, Florida